Strangers is a 2022 Nigerian drama film written by Anthony Eloka, produced by Banji Adesanmi and directed by Biodun Stephen. The movie won the Gold Award for Directing at the International Independent Film Awards held in Los Angeles. and it stars Lateef Adedimeji, Bimbo Oshin, Bolaji Ogunmola, Debbie Felix, Femi Adebayo.

Synopsis 
Strangers is a story of a young traditional boy who is unbothered by civilization but had to deal with a life-ending disease. The movie took another dimension when the people he has never met showed at his threshold.

Premiere 
Prior to the official release of the movie, it was first screened to a group of critics and the crew members at Genesis Cinemas, Maryland Mall, Lagos 21 April 2022 and the movie was released to the cinemas on 29 April 2022.

Cast 
Lateef Adedimeji
Bimbo Oshin
Bolaji Ogunmola
Debbie Felix
Femi Adebayo
Ndamo Damarise
Chris Iheuwa
Jide Kosoko
Bimbo Akintola
Myde Glover
Nonso Odogwu

References 

2022 films
Nigerian drama films
English-language Nigerian films
2022 drama films